Shuil Rural District is a rural district (dehestan) in Rahimabad District, Rudsar County, Gilan Province, Iran. At the 2006 census, its population was 3,146, in 938 families. The rural district has 50 villages.

References 

Rural Districts of Gilan Province
Rudsar County